Bruce Gurney from the HGST, a subsidiary of Western Digital, in San Jose, CA was named Fellow of the Institute of Electrical and Electronics Engineers (IEEE) in 2014 for contributions to spin valve Giant Magnetoresistance sensors for magnetic recording systems.

References 

Fellow Members of the IEEE
Living people
Engineers from California
Year of birth missing (living people)
American electrical engineers